The Valois (also  , ; originally Pagus Valensis) was a region in the valley of the Oise river in Picardy in the north of France. It was a fief in West Francia and subsequently the Kingdom of France until its counts furnished a line of kings, the House of Valois, to succeed the House of Capet in 1328. It was, along with the counties of Beauvais, the Vexin, Vermandois, and Laon, part of the "Oise line" of fiefdoms which were held often by one individual or an individual family as a string of defences against Viking assault on Paris.

The medieval county and duchy of Valois was located in northern France. It was included in the northerneastern part of the government of Île-de-France, while being part of the province of Picardy. Its capital was Crépy-en-Valois.

Counts of Valois

Carolingian counts 
Pepin, Count of Vermandois and Valois (Pepin II), son of Bernard, King of Italy.
 ca. 886–893 Pepin III – son of previous, count of Vermandois and Valois.
 ca. 893–895 Herbert I, Count of Vermandois – brother of previous, count of Vermandois.

Counts of disputed origin 
 about 895–919 Ermenfroi, also count of Amiens and the Vexin
 915–926 Ralph I of Ostrevent, also count of Amiens and the Vexin, married daughter, Eldegarde, of preceding
 926–943 Ralph II, also count of Amiens and the Vexin, son of preceding
 943-after 992 Walter I, also count of Amiens and the Vexin, apparently brother or son of preceding
 about 998-after 1017 Walter II the White, also count of Amiens and the Vexin, son of preceding
1017/24–1038 Ralph III of Valois
1025–1074 Ralph IV, also count of the Vexin and Amiens after 1063, whose third wife was Anne of Kiev, dowager queen of France (that marriage was childless)
1074–1077 Simon de Crépy, also count of the Vexin and Amiens, he became a monk, and his lands were dispersed, Valois going to his sister's husband
Adele of Valois – the sister of Simon

Vermandois Carolingian counts 
Herbert IV (−1080), Count of Vermandois, a descendant of Pepin II, became count of Valois by marriage with Adele, daughter of Ralph IV
 Odo I the Insane (1080–1085), Count of Vermandois and of Valois, son of previous, he was disinheredited by the council of Barons of France and then he was lord of Saint-Simon by marriage.
 Adelaide – sister of previous, countess of Vermandois and Valois, wife of Hugh.

Capetian counts 
 Hugh I Magnus (the Great) (1085–1101), Count of Vermandois and of Valois, son of Henry I and Anne of Kiev.
 Raoul I the Valiant (1102–1152), also known as Le Borgne, Count of Vermandois and of Valois, son of previous.
 Hugh II (1152–1160), Count of Vermandois and of Valois, son of Raoul I and Eléonore of Blois.
 Raoul II (1160–1167), Count of Vermandois and of Valois, son of Raoul I and of Petronilla of Aquitaine.
 Philip of Alsace (1167–1185), Count of Flanders (1168–1191), Count of Vermandois and of Valois by marriage

To the royal domain by king Philip II

Blanche of Castile (1240–1252)
Jean-Tristan (1269–1270)

Valois counts 
In royal domain
Charles I (1284–1325)
Philip I (1325–1328)
in royal domain
Philip II (1344–1375)
in royal domain
Louis I (1386?–1406)

Dukes of Valois 
Charles d'Orléans (1406–1465)
Louis (1465–1498)
in royal domain
François (Duke 1498–1515, King of France as Francis I, 1515–1547)
in royal domain but granted to several ladies of the royal house
Marguerite de Valois (1582–1615)
in royal domain
Gaston (1626–1660)
Jean Gaston d'Orléans (1650–1652)
Philippe de France (1660–1701)
Philippe Charles d'Orléans (1664–1666)
Alexandre Louis d'Orléans (1673–1676)
Philippe d'Orléans (1701–1723)
Louis d'Orléans (1723–1752)
Louis Philippe d'Orléans (1752–1785)
 1773–1785 Louis Philippe d'Orléans (1773–1850)
Philippe d'Orléans (1785–1793)
Louis Philippe d'Orléans (1773–1850)

Thus the house of Valois is descended from Charles I, and has been divided into several lines, three of which have reigned in France. These are:
 the direct line, beginning with Philip VI, which reigned from 1328 to 1498
 the Orléans branch, descended from Louis XII, from 1498 to 1515
 the Angoulême branch, descendants of John, Count of Angoulême, from 1515 to 1589.

Other Valois branches are: the dukes of Alençon, descendants of Charles, a younger son of Charles I, count of Valois; the Dukes of Anjou, descendants of Louis, the second son of King John II; and the dukes of Burgundy, descendants of Philip, the fourth son of the same king.

Notes

References 
Anselme, (Père), Histoire généalogique et chronologique de la Maison Royale de France, des pairs, grands officiers de la couronne & de la maison du Roy, 1726.
Fouquier-Cholet, Eloi, Q.A. Histoire des comtes héréditaires de Vermandois, Saint-Quentin, 1832.
Mabillon, Jean, Annales ord. Sancti Benedicti. Ticinense. Lucae, 1739.
Moreri, Louis, Le Grand Dictionnaire Historique, Paris, 1743–1749.

 
 
Valois
Valois
Valois